Indian Audit and Accounts Service is a Central Group 'A' central civil service under the Comptroller and Auditor General of India, Government of India. The central civil servants under the Indian Audit and Accounts Service serve in an audit managerial capacity, in the Indian Audit and Accounts Department. IA&AS is responsible for auditing the accounts of the Union and State governments and public sector organizations, and for maintaining the accounts of State governments. Its role is somewhat similar to the US GAO and National Audit Office (United Kingdom).

The service can be divided into officers looking after accounting and audit issues pertaining to the Union government and the State governments, and those manning the department's headquarters. The state accounts and audit offices are headed by Accountants General or Principal Accountants General. They are functionally equivalent; only the designations vary. Major states have three Principal Accountants General (PAsG) or Accountants General (AsG), each heading Accounts and Entitlement (i.e., compiling state accounts, maintaining pension accounts, loan accounts, etc.), Cluster 1 (General Administration, Finance, Health & Family Welfare, Water Resource, Rural Development, PRIs, Agriculture & Food) or Cluster 2 (Energy, Power, Industry & Commerce, Transport, Urban Development, Environment, S&T, Information Technology Public Works, Law & Order, Art & Culture)

The equivalent officers at the Central level are Principal Directors (PDs) or Directors General (DsG). The PDs, DsG, AsG and PAsG report to Additional Deputy CAG   or Deputy CAG. The Deputy CAGs are the highest-ranked officers in the service.

After training, the Officer Trainees are posted as Assistant Accountant General Assistant Directors a Junior Grade Group A later promoted to Deputy Accountants General (DAsG) or Deputy Directors (DDs) a Senior time scale. Subsequent to their promotion, they become Senior Deputy Accountants General (Sr.DAsG) or Directors. All officers below the rank of AG/PD are also called Group Officers as they are generally in charge of a group in the office.

Recruitment and training

Recruitment to the IA&AS is through the joint competitive examinations the Union Public Service Commission and through promotion from the subordinate cadre. The training is split into two phases. Phase-1 involves giving a theoretical background to the students on concepts of Government and commercial auditing and accounting. Phase-2 gives emphasis on practical training. The training involves modules where Officer Trainees are attached to the Reserve Bank of India, TISS-Mumbai, SEBI the National Institute of Public Finance and Policy, NIFM Faridabad, the Bureau of Parliamentary Studies and the Indian Institute of Management, Ahmedabad. Apart from this they were also given training on Emerging areas in IT Environment and its Audit, some of the technologies includes IoT, Cyber Security & Blockchain by International Training Centre of the Comptroller and Auditor General of India. The Officer Trainees are also given an international exposure through attachment with London School of Economics and Political Science and National Audit Office (United Kingdom).

Sanctioned strength

Sanctioned strength of IA&AS Cadre

Deputy Comptroller and Auditor General: 9 (equivalent to Secretary to Govt. of India)
Additional Deputy Comptroller and Auditor General: 10 (equivalent to Special Secretary to Govt. of India)
Principal Accountant General: 86 (equivalent to Addl. Secretary to Govt. of India) 
Accountant General (SAG): 97 (equivalent to Joint Secretary to Govt. of India)
Sr. Deputy Accountant General (JAG): 165 (Selection Grade 74 and Ordinary Grade 73) (equivalent to Deputy Secretary/Director to Govt. of India)
Deputy Accountant General (STS): 228 (equivalent to Under Secretary to Govt. of India)
Assistant Accountant General (JTS): 102 (equivalent to Asst. Secretary to Govt. of India)

References

Accounting in India
Central Civil Services (India)